The Hemphill River is a river of the northwestern South Island of New Zealand. It flows through rugged country to the south of Kahurangi National Park, forming two small lakes (Lake Phyllis and Lake Marina) on its route south to join with the Mōkihinui River North Branch, which joins the Mōkihinui River short after.

See also
List of rivers of New Zealand

References

Rivers of the West Coast, New Zealand
Buller District
Rivers of New Zealand